John Ernest "Jack" Randall (May 22, 1924 – April 26, 2020) was an American ichthyologist and a leading authority on coral reef fishes. Randall described over 800 species and authored 11 books and over 900 scientific papers and popular articles. He spent most of his career working in Hawaii. He died in April 2020 at the age of 95.

Career
John Ernest Randall was born in Los Angeles, California in May 1924, to John and Mildred (McKibben) Randall. In high school he acquired a love of marine fish after a visit to the tide pools of Palos Verdes and, after serving stateside in the Medical Corps of the U.S. Army during the post-D-Day years of WWII, received his BA degree from the University of California, Los Angeles in 1950. In 1955 he earned his Ph.D in ichthyology from the University of Hawaii. 

After spending two years as a research associate at the Bishop Museum in Honolulu, Hawaii, he moved to Miami, Florida and worked briefly at the University of Miami's Marine Laboratory, alongside C. Richard Robins who remained there for his career. From 1961–1965 he worked as Professor of Zoology and also, from 1962–1965, as the director of the Institute of Marine Biology at the University of Puerto Rico. From 1965–1966 he served as the director of the Pacific Foundation of Marine Research's Oceanic Institute, Makapuu Point, Hawaii. From 1966 to 1984 he worked as an ichthyologist at the Bishop Museum, becoming chairman of the museum’s zoology department in 1975 and gaining the title of Senior Ichthyologist in 1984.  He also, concurrently, served as a marine biologist at the Institute of Marine Biology, University of Hawaii. 

In 2005 he was awarded the first Bleeker Award in Systematic Ichthyology at the Seventh Indo-Pacific Fish Conference in Taipei, Taiwan.

Works
Fishes of the Gilbert Islands, Atoll Res. Bull. 1955, No. 47 (xi - 243 pp.), Pac. Sci, Bd., Nat. Acad. Sci., Wash D. C. 
A Contribution to the Biology of the Acanthuridae (Surgeon Fishes) (1955, in Issue 10 of Theses for the degree of Doctor of Philosophy, University of Hawaii (Honolulu))
A review of the labrid fish genus Labroides, with descriptions of two new species and notes on ecology. Pac. Sci. 
Let a Sleeping Shark Lie, 1961
Three New Butterflyfishes (chaetodontidae) from Southeast Oceania, 1975
(with Henri Lavondès) Les noms de poissons marquisiens, 1978
(with Roger Lubbock) Three New Labrid Fishes of the Genus Cirrhilabrus from the Southwestern Pacific (in Volume 25, Issue 2 of Occasional papers of the Bernice Pauahi Bishop Museum of Polynesian Ethnology and Natural History, Bishop Museum Press, 1982)
Caribbean Reef Fishes, 1983
Pomacanthus Rhomboides (Gilchrist and Thompson), the Valid Name for the South African Angelfish Previously Known as Pomacanthus Striatus (J.L.B. Smith Institute of Ichthyology, 1988)
Coastal Fishes of Oman (1995)
Shore Fishes of Hawaii (1996)
Annoted Checklist of the Inshore Fishes of the Ogasawara Islands (in Volume 11 of National Science Museum monographs, National Science Museum, 1997)
(with Phillip C. Heemstra) Review of the Indo-Pacific Fish Genus Odontanthias (Serranidae: Anthiinae), with Descriptions of Two New Species and a Related New Genus in Volume 38 of Indo-Pacific fishes, Bishop Museum, 2006
(with Jeffrey W. Johnson) Revision of the soleid fish genus Pardachirus, in Indo-Pacific fishes, Bishop Museum, 2007
(with William N Eschmeyer) Revision of the Indo-Pacific Scorpionfish Genus Scorpaenopsis: With Descriptions of Eight New Species in Indo-Pacific fishes
Revision of the Goatfish Genus Parupeneus (Perciformes: Mullidae) with Descriptions of Two New Species in Indo-Pacific fishes
(with Phillip C. Heemstra) Review of the Indo-Pacific Fishes of the Genus Odontanthias (Serranidae: Anthiinae), with Descriptions of Two New Species and a Related New Genus in Indo-Pacific fishes
(with Margaret M. Smith) A review of the Labrid fishes of the Genus Halichoeres of the Western Indian Ocean, with descriptions of six new species in Ichthyological Bulletin of the J.L.B. Smith Institute of Ichthyology; No. 45. J.L.B. Smith Institute of Ichthyology, Rhodes University. (1982)
(with David W. Greenfield) A preliminary review of the Indo-Pacific Gobiid fishes of the genus Gnatholepis in Ichthyological Bulletin of the J.L.B. Smith Institute of Ichthyology; No. 69. J.L.B. Smith Institute of Ichthyology, Rhodes University. (2001)
Parenti, P. and J.E. Randall, 2000. An annotated checklist of the species of the labroid fish families Labridae and Scaridae. Ichthyol. Bull. J.L.B. Smith Inst. Ichthyol. (68):1-97.

Taxon described by him
See :Category:Taxa named by John Ernest Randall

References

1924 births
2020 deaths
American ichthyologists
University of California alumni
University of Hawaiʻi at Mānoa alumni
Military personnel from California
Scientists from Los Angeles
20th-century American zoologists
21st-century American zoologists